The 2022 eBay Motors 200  was a NASCAR Pinty's Series race that was held on May 22, 2022. It was contested over 51 laps on the  road course. It was the 2nd race of the 2022 NASCAR Pinty's Series season. Kevin Lacroix turned Gary Klutt in the final turn to collect the victory.

Report

Entry list 

 (R) denotes rookie driver.
 (i) denotes driver who is ineligible for series driver points.

Practice

Qualifying

Qualifying results

Race 

Laps: 57

Race statistics 

 Lead changes:  6
 Cautions/Laps: 2 for 9 laps
 Time of race: 1:41:03
 Average speed: 83.224 mph

References 

2022 NASCAR Pinty's Series
eBay Motors 200